The Kingdom of Afghanistan was a constitutional monarchy in Central Asia established in 1926 as a successor state to the Emirate of Afghanistan. It was proclaimed by its first king, Amanullah Khan, seven years after he acceded to the throne. The monarchy ended in the 1973 Afghan coup d'état.

History
Emir Amanullah Khan was keen on modernizing Afghanistan, provoking several uprisings led by his conservative opponents. One such rebellion broke out while he was visiting Europe in 1927. He abdicated in favour of his brother Inayatullah Khan, who only ruled for three days before the leader of the rebellion Habibullāh Kalakāni took power and reinstated the Emirate.

After 10 months, Amanullah Khan's Minister of War, Mohammad Nadir, returned from exile in India. His British-supported armies sacked Kabul, forcing Kalakāni to discuss a truce. Instead, Mohammed Nadir's forces apprehended and subsequently executed Kalakāni. Mohammed Nadir reinstated the kingdom, was proclaimed King of Afghanistan as Mohammad Nadir Shah in October 1929, and went on to revert the reformist path of the last king, Amanullah Khan. He was succeeded by his son, Mohammad Zahir Shah, whose rule started in 1933 and lasted for 39 years. Zahir Shah, the last King of Afghanistan, was eventually overthrown by his own cousin Mohammad Daoud Khan who successfully ended the centuries-old monarchy and established a republic. It was under the leadership of Zahir Shah that the Afghan government sought relationships with the outside world, most notably with the Soviet Union, France, Great Britain, and the United States.

On 27 September 1934, during the reign of Zahir Shah, the Kingdom of Afghanistan joined the League of Nations. During World War II, Afghanistan remained neutral and pursued a diplomatic policy of non-alignment. Though being neutral in World War II, Afghanistan had relations with Nazi Germany, but that was severed after the Anglo-Soviet invasion of Iran.

Afghanistan was admitted into the United Nations on 29 August 1946. In 1947, Afghanistan was the only United Nations member to vote against admitting Pakistan into the United Nations. This was mostly done because of Kingdom's call for Pashtunistan. Nikita Khrushchev visited the capital of Kabul and endorsed the Afghan claims to Pashtunistan in 1955. Afghanistan also became a member of the Non-Aligned Movement in 1961. Daoud Khan, Prime Minister of Afghanistan at the time, worked hard for the development of modern industries, and education in the country. In July 1973, Daoud Khan staged a bloodless coup d'état while Zahir Shah was not in the country. The next month, Zahir Shah abdicated, hoping to avoid a civil war, which officially marked the end of the Kingdom of Afghanistan and the beginning of the Republic.

Geography 
The Kingdom of Afghanistan bordered Iran on the west, the Soviet Union in the north, China on the east, and Pakistan and India on the south. The strange shape and borders of the country, most notably the Wakhan Corridor, were a result of its former role as a buffer state between Russia and the United Kingdom. Snow was common in most areas during winter and rainfall was small.

Demographics
The country was made up of various ethnic groups such as the Pashtuns, Tajiks, Hazaras, Uzbeks and many others.

The majority of Afghans were Muslim, approximate 99% of the population. Around 90% of the Muslim population were Sunni, the rest were Shia.

Dari (Persian) and Pashto were the official languages of the nation. Many Afghans were bilingual and could speak both languages between each other.

Economy 
Like the past and present-day Afghanistan, the economy relied greatly on agriculture and mining.

The United States and the Soviet Union both invested in neutral Afghanistan's economy to try to gain influence during the Cold War. This included the Four Point Program in 1951, when Afghanistan and the United States signed an agreement in Kabul to help assist the economic development in the economy, and the construction of a 100 km pipeline from Termez to Mazar-i-Sharif that was built by Soviet technicians and began in 1954. Afghanistan received $18,500,000 from the Export–Import Bank of the United States to help them purchase U.S. material, equipment, and services for the Helmand River valley developmental project.

In August 1961, Pakistan closed the border with Afghanistan, due to Prime Minister, Daoud Khan's strong stance on Pashtunistan, but it re-opened in May after Khan's resignation.

The country had deposits of talc, mica, silver, lead, beryl, chromite, copper, lapis lazuli, and iron ore.

Military 
King Zahir Shah's cousin, Daoud Khan, signed a $3 million arms deal with the Czechoslovak Socialist Republic and a 32.5 million arms deal with the Soviet Union in 1956. The deal gave the Afghan military imported T-34 tanks and MiG-17 jet fighters. A quarter to third of all Afghan officers had trained in the Soviet Union by 1973.

See also 
 Barakzai dynasty 
 European influence in Afghanistan
 List of Sunni dynasties
 Afghan Civil War (1928–1929)

References 

 
Kingdom of Afghanistan
Kingdom of Afghanistan
Kingdom of Afghanistan
Kingdom of Afghanistan
 Former monarchies of South Asia
 Former monarchies of Central Asia
 Former kingdoms
Kingdom of Afghanistan
Kingdom of Afghanistan
Kingdom of Afghanistan
Kingdom of Afghanistan
Kingdom of Afghanistan
Kingdom of Afghanistan
Neutral states in World War II
Kingdom of Afghanistan
Kingdom of Afghanistan
Kingdom of Afghanistan
Kingdom of Afghanistan
Kingdom of Afghanistan
Kingdom of Afghanistan
Kingdom of Afghanistan